Epp Eespäev (born 25 October 1961 in Võru) is an Estonian actress.

In 1988 she graduated from Tallinn State Conservatory. Since 1988 she is working at Tallinn City Theatre.

Eespäev was previously married to actor and politician Artur Talvik. The couple have two children, a son and a daughter.

Awards:
 1987: Voldemar Panso prize
 1996:

Selected filmography

 1992 Daam autos (feature film; role: Daam)
 1993 Suflöör (feature film; role: Melissa)
 1994 Tulivesi (feature film; role: Hilda)
 2003-2004 Kodu keset linna (television series; role: Marju)
 2011 Ainult meie kolm (feature film; role: Regina)
 2014 Zero Point (film)|Nullpunkt (feature film; role: Johannes' mother)
 2018 Võta või jäta (feature film; role: Evi, Erik's mother)
 2022 Soo (feature film; role: Metskassi ema)

References

Living people
1961 births
Estonian stage actresses
Estonian film actresses
Estonian television actresses
20th-century Estonian actresses
21st-century Estonian actresses
Estonian Academy of Music and Theatre alumni
People from Võru